Rob Armstrong (born 12 September 1996) is a Canadian ice sledge hockey player. He was on his nation's silver medal-winning team in para ice hockey at the 2018 Winter Paralympics after helping his team win Gold in 2017 at World Para Ice Hockey Championships. Armstrong is a three-time silver medalist at World Sledge Hockey Challenge.

His disability is due to a childhood infection of the spine. This illness has made him reliant on a wheelchair. He began playing para ice hockey a few years later after he fell in love with the sport while playing goaltender in road hockey with his friends.

References

External links 
 
 

1996 births
Living people
Canadian sledge hockey players
Para ice hockey players at the 2018 Winter Paralympics
Para ice hockey players at the 2022 Winter Paralympics
Medalists at the 2018 Winter Paralympics
Medalists at the 2022 Winter Paralympics
Paralympic sledge hockey players of Canada
Paralympic silver medalists for Canada
Sportspeople from Guelph
Paralympic medalists in sledge hockey